The Alexis de Tocqueville Award may refer to a number of awards named after the prominent Frenchman who wrote Democracy in America. The current known awards include:
 The Alexis de Tocqueville award awarded by the Independent Institute
 The Alexis de Tocqueville Award for Excellence in Advancement of Educational Freedom awarded by the Alliance for the Separation of School & State
 The Alexis de Tocqueville award awarded by the Alexis de Tocqueville Institute, an institute accused of using research to get results predefined by its sponsors
 The Alexis de Tocqueville Award awarded to alumni by the School of Diplomacy and International Relations at Seton Hall University